Maria Piechotka (12 July 1920 – 28 November 2020) was a Polish architect and politician who served as a member of the Sejm.

References

1920 births
2020 deaths
Members of the Polish Sejm 1961–1965
Women members of the Sejm of the Polish People's Republic
Politicians from Kraków
Architects from Kraków
Polish centenarians
Women centenarians
Warsaw University of Technology alumni
Burials at Bródno Cemetery